Ginny McSwain is an American voice actress, voice casting director, and animation production professional.

Life and career
McSwain graduated from Stephens College in 1974, before moving to Los Angeles. She has worked as casting director on numerous projects for Hanna-Barbera, including The All-New Scooby and Scrappy-Doo Show, The Kwicky Koala Show and The Smurfs. McSwain's first job as voice director was for the English-language version of Lucky Luke. She won a 2006 Daytime Emmy for The Batman and subsequently a 2010 and 2011 Emmy for Fanboy & Chum Chum.

Among her most well-known animation productions are The Adventures of Jimmy Neutron: Boy Genius, My Little Pony, Bump in the Night, and Goof Troop.

In 2013, McSwain voice directed Transformers: Rescue Bots, Randy Cunningham: 9th Grade Ninja and Gravity Falls.

Since 2016, she is the voice director for the Netflix animated series Spirit Riding Free. She is currently casting and voice directing If You Give a Mouse a Cookie and The Rocketeer.

Filmography

Television
 Bobby's World - Director (in "Fish Tales")
 CB Bears - Sheena
 Galaxy Goof-Ups - Additional Voices
 Superman - Lois Lane, Faora, Ursa
 The All New Popeye Hour - Additional voices
 The New Shmoo - Additional Voices
 Transformers: Rescue Bots - Dr. McSwain
 Yogi's Space Race - Additional Voices

Film
 Scooby Goes Hollywood - Girl Fan, Kerry, Secretary
 I Know That Voice - Herself

Crew work
 Aladdin - Voice Director (seasons 1–2)
 Alvin and the Chipmunks Meet Frankenstein - Casting Director and Voice Director
 Alvin and the Chipmunks Meet the Wolfman - Casting Director and Voice Director
 Ape Escape - Voice Director
 Bobby's World - Voice Director
 Bonkers - Voice Director
 Bump in the Night - Voice Director
 Camp Candy - Casting and Voice Director
 Captain Planet and the Planeteers - Casting Director (seasons 1–2) and Recording Director (Season 4 episodes 1–13)
 Casper - Casting Director and Voice Director (season 1–2)
 CatDog - Casting and Voice Director
 ChalkZone - Casting and Voice Director
 Charlotte's Web 2: Wilbur's Great Adventure - Casting Director and Voice Director
 Danger Rangers - Voice Director
 Darkwing Duck - Dialogue Director
 Detroit Docona - Voice Director
 Dink, the Little Dinosaur - Voice Director
 Earthworm Jim - Voice Director
 Fanboy & Chum Chum - Voice Director (2009-2010) (12 episodes)
 G.I. Joe: A Real American Hero - Voice Director ("Operation: Dragonfire" mini-series)
 G.I. Joe: Renegades - Casting and Voice Director
 God of War - Additional Voice-Over Director
 Goof Troop - Dialogue Director
 Gravity Falls - Dialogue Director
 Hellboy: Blood and Iron - Voice Director
 Hellboy: Sword of Storms - Voice Director
 If You Give a Mouse a Cookie - Casting Director and Voice Director
 Jimmy Neutron: Boy Genius - Casting Director
 Kermit's Swamp Years - Voice Casting Director
 Kidd Video - Voice Director
 Kid Icarus: Uprising -  Voice Director
 Kid 'n Play - Voice Director
 Little Clowns of Happytown - Voice Director
 Little Wizards - Voice Director
 Lucky Luke - Voice Director
 Marsupilami - Dialogue Director 
 Mass Effect - Voice Director
 Mass Effect 2 - Voice Director
 Mass Effect 3 - Voice-Over Director
 Monchhichis - Casting Director
 My Friends Tigger & Pooh - Dialogue Director
 My Little Pony 'n Friends - Voice Director
 Oh Yeah! Cartoons - Casting and Voice Director
 Ozzy & Drix - Casting Director and Voice Director
 Pac-Man - Casting Director
 Pajama Sam: No Need to Hide When It's Dark Outside - Voice Director
 Pole Position - Voice Director
 Poochie - Casting Director
 Pooh's Heffalump Halloween Movie - Dialogue Director
 Problem Child - Voice Director
 ProStars - Voice Director
 Quack Pack - Voice Director
 Random! Cartoons - Voice Director
 Randy Cunningham: 9th Grade Ninja - Dialogue Director (Season 1)
 Raw Toonage - Dialogue Director
 Red Planet - Dialogue Director
 Resident Evil 4 - Voice Director
 Richie Rich - Casting Director
 Shirt Tales - Casting Director
 Sonic the Hedgehog - Casting Director and Voice Director
 Space Stars - Assistant Recording Director
 Superman - Voice Director
 Super Friends - Casting Director
 TaleSpin - Dialogue Director (61 episodes)
 The Adventures of Raggedy Ann and Andy - Casting and Recorder Director
 The Addams Family - Recording Director (Season 2)
 The Adventures of Jimmy Neutron: Boy Genius - Voice Director
 The All-New Scooby and Scrappy-Doo Show - Animation Casting Director
 The Batman - Casting Director and Voice Director (Seasons 1–3)
 The Biskitts - Casting Director
 The Book of Pooh - Dialogue Director
 The Dukes - Casting Director
 The Emperor's New School - Voice Casting Director and Dialogue Director (Season 1)
 The Flintstone Comedy Show - Assistant Recording Director
 The Flintstone Funnies - Assistant Recording Director
 The Fonz and the Happy Days Gang - Casting Director
 The Gary Coleman Show - Casting Director
 The Karate Kid - Voice Director
 The Kwicky Koala Show - Casting Director
 The Little Rascals - Casting Director
 The Littles - Voice Director
 The Mask: The Animated Series - Voice Director
 The Mork & Mindy / Laverne & Shirley / Fonz Hour - Animation Casting Director ("Laverne and Shirley" segment)
 The New Archies - Casting Director
 The New Scooby and Scrappy-Doo Show - Casting Director
 The New Woody Woodpecker Show - Voice Director
 The Return of Jafar - Voice Director
 The Rocketeer - Casting Director: Additional and Dialogue Director
 The Smurfs - Casting Director (seasons 1–4)
 The Wizard of Oz - Casting Director
 Transformers: Rescue Bots - Casting Director (seasons  2–4) and Voice Director
 Trollkins - Casting Director
 Tutenstein - Dialogue Director (seasons  1–2)
 What-a-Mess - Casting and Voice Director
 Wild West C.O.W.-Boys of Moo Mesa - Voice Director
 W.I.T.C.H. - Voice Director

References

External links
 Ginny McSwain
 
 Ginny McSwain on Rob Paulsen's Talkin Toons Podcast 2013

Living people
American casting directors
Women casting directors
American voice directors
American voice actresses
Daytime Emmy Award winners
Stephens College alumni
Hanna-Barbera people
21st-century American women
Year of birth missing (living people)